Campus placement or campus recruiting is a program conducted within universities or other educational institutions to provide jobs to students nearing completion of their studies. In this type of program, the educational institutions partner with corporations who wish to recruit from the student population.

See also
Campus Placements 
Job fair
National Association of Colleges and Employers

References 

Recruitment